Imyra, Tayra, Ipy - Taiguara is an album by the Brazilian singer-songwriter Taiguara, released by EMI-Odeon on 1976 (LP), by EMI-Toshiba exclusively in Japan on 2002 and, after an exhaustive years long campaign to “re-patriate” the album censored in Brazil nearly 30 years, via an independent website ran by daughter Imyra, finally, released on 2013, by Kuarup (CD).

Track listing

Personnel

Musicians
Taiguara - vocals, piano, mellotron
Hermeto Pascoal - flute
Toninho Horta - guitar
Nivaldo Ornelas - saxofone
Wagner Tiso - piano, keyboard
Mauro Senise - flute
J.T. Meirelles - flute
Raul Mascarenhas - flute
Netinho - flute
Macacheira - trombone
Novelli - bass
Zé Eduardo Nazário - percussion
Paulo Braga - drums
Jaques Morelenbaum - cello
Ubirajara Silva - bandoneon
Lúcia Morelenbaum - harp

Production
 Taiguara - orchestral arrengeaments
 Wagner Tiso - producer

References

Censorship in Brazil
1976 albums
Portuguese-language albums